The Town of Sawpit is a Statutory Town in San Miguel County, Colorado, United States. The town population was 40 at the 2010 census, making Sawpit the fourth least populous incorporated town in the state of Colorado.  The Telluride Post Office (ZIP Code 81435) serves Sawpit.

Geography

Demographics

As of the census of 2010, there were 40 people, 18 households, and 13 families residing in the town. The racial makeup of the town was 95.00% white.

There were 18 households, out of which 38.9% had children under the age of 18 living with them, 55.6% were married couples living together, and 27.8% were non-families. 22.2% of all households were made up of individuals living alone. The average household size was 2.22 and the average family size was 2.46.

In the town, the population was spread out, with 22.5% under the age of 19, 22.5% from 25 to 44, 52.5% from 45 to 64. The median age was 46 years. 42.5% of the population was female and 57.5% was male.

See also

 List of municipalities in Colorado

References

External links

 CDOT map of the Town of Sawpit

Towns in San Miguel County, Colorado
Towns in Colorado